Daniel Steuernagel (born 16 November 1979) is a German football manager, who last managed KFC Uerdingen 05.

Managerial career
In September 2019, Steuernagel was released by Kickers Offenbach.

On 16 October 2019, he was announced as the new manager of KFC Uerdingen. He was replaced by Stefan Krämer on 10 March 2020.

References

External links

Daniel Steuernagel profile 

1979 births
Living people
People from Laubach
Sportspeople from Giessen (region)
German footballers
Footballers from Hesse
FC Gießen players
German football managers
3. Liga managers
Kickers Offenbach managers
KFC Uerdingen 05 managers
Association footballers not categorized by position